Jagmeet Singh Jimmy Dhaliwal  (born January 2, 1979) is a Canadian politician who has served as the leader of the New Democratic Party (NDP) since 2017. Singh has sat as the member of Parliament (MP) for Burnaby South since 2019. He was elected to the Legislative Assembly of Ontario in 2011, representing Bramalea—Gore—Malton until his entry into federal politics. A practicing Sikh of Punjabi descent, Singh is an Indo-Canadian, making him the first Sikh and first visible minority to be elected to lead a major federal political party in Canada.

After graduating from Osgoode Hall Law School, Singh became a criminal defence lawyer, starting a law firm with his brother Gurratan. His political career began in 2011 where he contested the 2011 federal election in the federal riding of Bramalea—Gore—Malton which resulted in a narrow victory for Conservative opponent Bal Gosal; he became a member of Provincial Parliament (MPP) in the overlapping provincial riding later that year. In 2015, he became deputy leader of the Ontario New Democratic Party, serving under leader Andrea Horwath until 2017. Singh announced his candidacy for the federal New Democratic Party leadership following a leadership review that resulted in a leadership election to replace Tom Mulcair. Singh was elected leader on October 1, 2017, with a first round vote of 53.8 per cent in a field of four. In the 2019 federal election, the New Democrats under Singh lost 15 seats and dropped from third party to fourth party status. In the 2021 federal election, the NDP gained one seat and remained the fourth party.

Upon his election, Singh became the first person of a visible minority group to lead a major Canadian federal political party on a permanent basis, and the second overall after the Bloc Québécois’s former interim leader Vivian Barbot. Singh is also the first turban-wearing Indian and Sikh to sit as a provincial legislator in Ontario. He has been widely recognized in Canadian media for his fashion and style sense. Ideologically, Singh identifies as both a progressive and a social democrat. He advocates raising the federal minimum wage to $15 an hour, decriminalizing personal possession of all drugs, and supports eliminating several tax deductions available to the highest-income earners.

Early life and education (1979–2006) 
Singh was born on January 2, 1979, in Scarborough, Ontario, to Indian parents Harmeet Kaur and Jagtaran Singh. His parents are both from the Indian state of Punjab, with his mother being from Ghudani Khurd in Ludhiana district, while his father is from Thikriwala in Barnala district. His great-grandfather was Sewa Singh Thikriwala, a political activist who campaigned for the cause of Indian independence. Another great-grandfather, Hira Singh, served in World War I and World War II in the Sikh Regiment of the British Indian Army. After a year as a toddler living with his grandparents in India, Singh spent his early childhood in St. John's and Grand Falls-Windsor, both in Newfoundland and Labrador, before relocating with his family to Windsor, Ontario. Singh has publicly discussed suffering sexual abuse as a child from a martial arts coach, as well as having a father who struggled with alcoholism.

From grades 6 to 12, Singh attended Detroit Country Day School in Beverly Hills, Michigan. He went on to obtain a B.Sc. degree in biology from the University of Western Ontario in 2001 and in 2005 graduated as a Bachelor of Laws from York University's Osgoode Hall Law School. He was called to the bar of Ontario in 2006.

Singh has two younger siblings, brother Gurratan and sister Manjot, who were both born during the family's time in Newfoundland. Gurratan Singh was elected to the Legislative Assembly of Ontario in the 2018 Ontario election, representing the riding of Brampton East.

Early career (2006–2011) 
Singh worked as a criminal defence lawyer in the Greater Toronto Area before entering politics, first at the law firm Pinkofskys, then at his own practice, Singh Law, which he established with Gurratan. In a Toronto Star article published on January 9, 2012, Singh stated that his background in criminal defence contributed to his decision to enter politics, particularly his work advocating for the protection of rights entrenched in the Canadian Charter of Rights and Freedoms.

Early federal politics 
Singh provided pro bono consulting to an activist group that protested the visit to Canada of Kamal Nath, the Indian trade minister who had allegedly led armed mobs during the 1984 Delhi pogrom. After failing to get their views heard, Singh was inspired to run for office by the activist group so their concerns could be better represented.

Singh began his political career with his decision to run for member of Parliament in the 2011 federal election as the NDP candidate in the riding of Bramalea—Gore—Malton. During the election, Singh stopped using his surname, Dhaliwal (which is connected to caste), because he wanted to signal his rejection of the inequality inherent in the Indian caste system. Instead, he chose to use the more common Singh. Although he was defeated by Conservative candidate Bal Gosal by 539 votes, Singh finished ahead of incumbent Liberal MP Gurbax Singh Malhi.

Provincial politics (2011–2017)

First term (2011–2014)

Election 

Singh ran in the 2011 Ontario provincial election as the NDP candidate in the overlapping provincial riding, defeating Liberal incumbent Kuldip Kular by 2,277 votes. Singh became the first New Democrat elected to represent the Peel Region, as well as the first turban-wearing MPP. In the 40th Parliament of Ontario, Singh was appointed as the NDP critic for the attorney general and consumer services portfolios. He also served as his party's deputy house leader.

Activities 
Singh called for greater police accountability and demanded the provincial government draft legislation to strengthen Ontario's Special Investigations Unit (SIU). He criticized the attorney general in 2011 after the release of a report by the ombudsman, André Marin that found the province had undermined the SIU. Singh said, "The comprehensive failure of the ministry to address concerns about the SIU and give it a proper mandate is simply unacceptable, and I expect immediate action from the new Attorney General."

In March 2012, Singh introduced a private member's bill, "An Act to Amend the Insurance Act", to address high auto insurance rates. This bill would have ended the industry practice of basing insurance rates on geographic location. The bill received numerous complaints that it would have raised rates in rural and Northern Ontario and failed to pass second reading.

In May 2012, Singh introduced a private member's bill called "An Act to amend the Consumer Protection Act, 2002" to address high fees on overseas money transfers. The bill died on the order paper when the legislature was prorogued in September 2012.

In March 2013, Singh introduced a motion calling on the Liberal government to reduce auto insurance premiums by 15 percent. Singh's motion was passed by the legislature, and the 15 percent reduction was to be included in the Liberal government's 2013 budget.

In December 2013, legislation introduced by Singh to have the month of April recognized as Sikh Heritage Month in the province of Ontario was passed by the legislature.

Second term (2014–2017)

Re-election 

Singh ran for re-election in 2014. He won his riding with 43.6 per cent of the vote, beating Liberal challenger Kuldip Kular, whom Singh also ran against and unseated in 2011, and PC challenger Harjit Jaswal.

Activities 

In November 2014, Singh voted against the government's legislation entitled "Fighting Fraud and Reducing Automobile Rates Act", after arguing there were major shortcomings in the legislation regarding the driver's right to sue auto insurance companies. Singh said, "removing more protections for people is not the right way to go, it's a significant loss of our rights, and this is not a good bill."

In March 2015 during the Ontario sex education curriculum controversy Singh spoke out against changes to the curriculum which had not been updated since 1998 and proposal changes on teaching on sexual orientation and gender identity saying he disagreed with the "age appropriateness of some materials" and a "mistake on the Liberal government’s part" and "disrespectful to parents".

In November 2015, Singh introduced a private member's bill to the legislature regarding Tarion. Tarion was created by the provincial government in 1976 to be the regulator of the province's homebuilding industry. Singh's proposed legislation would give the Ontario Ombudsman the jurisdiction to investigate the practices of the corporation, as well as force Tarion to produce a detailed track record of their builds, and include all of their employees who make over $100,000 on the sunshine list. The proposed legislation would also subject Tarion bylaws to the approval of the provincial government.

In October 2015, Singh introduced a motion calling on the government to instruct police services in Ontario to end arbitrary street checks, known as carding. On October 22, 2015, the legislature unanimously passed Singh's motion.

Singh sparked controversy when he introduced a private members bill to allow turban-wearing Sikhs to ride a motorcycle without a helmet. After the motion was denied, Singh released statement declaring "While the Wynne Liberals are happy to pay lip service to civil rights, when the rubber meets the road, this so-called activist premier is quick to deny the Sikh community rights recognized elsewhere". Wynne countered by stating that "Mortality rates have gone down 30 per cent and head injury rates down 75 per cent in jurisdictions with such (motorcycle helmet) laws".

Singh was a critic of the province's handling of the Ornge Air Ambulance service and called for greater oversight of the agency. Ornge was the subject of an investigation that found the air ambulance service paid a $1.4 million salary to its president while failing to provide timely emergency services. Singh said, "No more flying blind at Ornge. The people of Ontario have been paying the bills at Ornge with scarce health dollars. They deserve the facts about what's happened. A key first step is making executive contracts immediately available to the public."

In June 2015, Singh was chastised by the integrity commissioner for the improper use of legislative resources meant for his constituency office for partisan purposes. The integrity commissioner's report found that in March 2015, Singh had improperly allowed his constituency office in Brampton to organize bus trips to take supporters to a partisan federal NDP rally in Toronto and that Singh's inclusion of a donation link on his constituency website contravened parliamentary convention. Because Singh did not intentionally break the ethics policy and had proactively acted to fix the breaches when alerted, he was not fined or otherwise punished, and the integrity commissioner only recommended that Singh's staff undergo additional training.

In December 2016, Singh spoke out against the motion introduced by Progressive Conservative MPP Gila Martow, which called for the legislature to denounce the Boycott, Divestment and Sanctions campaign.

On October 20, 2017, after winning the federal NDP leadership race, Singh resigned as MPP.

Outside Ontario 
During the Alberta general election in May 2015, Singh campaigned for the Alberta New Democratic Party, reaching out to voters on behalf of Irfan Sabir, who was running in Calgary-McCall. Sabir was later elected, and was appointed to Premier Rachel Notley's Cabinet as Minister of Social Services. Singh also campaigned for the British Columbia NDP and Nova Scotia NDP in those provinces' 2017 elections.

Singh endorsed and campaigned for Wab Kinew in the Manitoba NDP's 2017 leadership race.

Following the death of communist dictator Fidel Castro in October 2017, Singh tweeted "He saw a country wracked by poverty, illiteracy & disease. So he led a revolution that uplifted the lives of millions. RIP #FidelCastro". When challenged about this subsequently, he doubled down on his praise of Castro.

Leader of the New Democratic Party (2017–present)

Leadership election 

After Tom Mulcair lost a leadership review vote at the 2016 federal NDP convention, Singh was considered a potential leadership candidate, winning the support of 11 per cent of NDP members in a Mainstreet Research poll conducted in April 2016, and was statistically tied for second place. Singh was considered a leading candidate to replace Horwath as NDP leader if she lost the 42nd Ontario general election. He announced his intention to run for the leadership of the New Democratic Party of Canada at a campaign launch on May 15, 2017, in Brampton.

In August, Singh created controversy when he claimed that his candidacy had led to 47,000 sign-ups for the party. Several rival campaigns, most notably Charlie Angus's, accused Singh of inflating party membership sign-ups. A poll by Mainstreet Research was released in September, showing Singh overtaking Charlie Angus to lead the race for the first time with 27.3 per cent of the vote. Several days before the leadership vote, a video of Singh confronting a heckler, who accused him of plotting to subject Canada to sharia law, went viral leading to Singh getting praise for his handling of the situation and helping him win the NDP leadership.

Singh was elected leader of the federal NDP in the leadership election on October 1, 2017, having won on the first ballot with 53.8 per cent of the vote. Soon after his election as leader, Singh named leadership rival Guy Caron as parliamentary leader of the NDP.

Leading from outside Parliament (2017-2019) 
Singh initially opted to lead the NDP from outside of Parliament. He indicated that he preferred to run in a seat where he feels a "genuine connection" rather than any "safe" seat. Singh had stated that he would most likely run in Brampton East, which includes the bulk of his old provincial riding, in the 2019 election. Soon after his election as leader, Singh named leadership rival Guy Caron as parliamentary leader of the NDP.

In his first interview following winning the party leadership, Singh expressed doubts on the findings of the 18-month long inquiry led by former Supreme Court justice John Major into the bombing of Air India Flight 182 which left 329 people dead — 268 of them Canadians. The inquiry pointed to Talwinder Singh Parmar as the chief terrorist behind the bombing. In the same interview and many subsequent ones, Singh was unwilling to denounce extremists within Canadian Sikhs who pay homage to Parmar as a martyr. On March 18, 2018, a day after video of Singh speaking a 2015 rally in San Francisco where Jarnail Singh Bhindranwale, often labelled as a terrorist, was honoured as a martyr in a massive poster on the main stage, Singh reversed his position.

In October 2017, CBC journalist Susan Bonner was criticized for appearing to mistakenly identify Navdeep Bains, a Liberal Cabinet minister, as Singh on Twitter. Singh and Bains are both turban-wearing, bearded Sikh men of South Asian descent. Bonner later apologized for the misunderstanding and deleted the tweet.

In a December 2017 interview with Bloomberg, Singh explained that he would not rule out working with the Conservatives to topple a federal government led by Trudeau if the NDP held the balance of power in a minority parliament.

In February 2018, Singh suspended Saskatchewan MP Erin Weir from the NDP caucus although no direct complaints had been made against him. Singh had 220 emails sent out to women connected with the NDP, as well as appearing on television soliciting complaints against Weir, which ended up receiving 15 complaints of which 11 were dismissed as trivial. Weir was formally expelled from caucus on May 3, 2018, based upon the outcome of the sexual harassment investigation which stated Weir's conduct was described by an investigator as “on the low-end of the scale,” and which would not normally be understood as “sexual harassment.” It was alleged he argued excessively over carbon levies with a staffer of then party leader Tom Mulcair's during a NDP convention and also he stood too close when speaking to people. In May 2018, a group of 67 former NDP MPs and MLAs from Saskatchewan sent Singh a letter in support of Weir and calling for his reinstatement as an NDP MP. On September 6, 2018, Singh rejected Weir's request to rejoin the NDP during a meeting in June, despite Weir stating that he had worked with a personal trainer to understand the issues of the complaint.

After the May 2019 by-election defeat in Kitimat, Singh flip-flopped the NDP's position on environmental and energy policy.

2019 Burnaby South by-election 

On August 8, 2018, Singh announced he would be running in a by-election to replace Kennedy Stewart as the Member of Parliament for Burnaby South. Stewart had resigned in order to make an ultimately successful bid for Mayor of Vancouver. Singh relocated to Burnaby for the election and won on February 25, 2019, with 38.9 per cent of the vote.

2019 federal election 

On October 21, 2019, Singh was re-elected to the Burnaby South riding. The NDP won 24 seats, down from 44 seats at the 2015 election. However, the incumbent Trudeau Liberal government failed to retain its majority, allowing the NDP to share the balance of power in Parliament. It was the lowest seat count for the NDP since 2004, and the party was passed by the Bloc Québécois as the third-largest parliamentary party. The NDP lost all but one of its seats in Quebec, where it was suggested that Singh's Sikhism may have been negatively received by voters in the context of the Quebec ban on religious symbols.

43rd Canadian Parliament
On June 17, 2020, Singh was removed from the House of Commons for the rest of the day after he called Bloc Québécois MP Alain Therrien a "racist" and refused to apologize when Therrien was the sole member to prevent unanimous consent on the second motion concluding systemic racism and discrimination in the Royal Canadian Mounted Police (RCMP) prior to the completion of the public inquiry from Singh's first motion.

2021 federal campaign
In the 2021 federal campaign Singh was proud to announce that he was the only leader with plan to enforce mandatory Covid-19 vaccination for employees that work under a collective bargaining contract. Singh made it a campaign promise that "All collective agreements include a process for progressive discipline - up to and including termination. Discipline should always be a last resort, but may be necessary in rare cases to protect the health and safety of Canadians." On 5 September he returned to the subject in a press conference with the NDP candidate for the riding of Ottawa-Centre. Here he laid out his promise to "[supply] $1 billion in targeted vaccination programs," as well as to create "a national vaccine passport system", to extend pandemic supports, and to strengthen "laws to protect health care workers and those seeking care from harassment and attacks." He attracted support from other party leaders including Justin Trudeau and Erin O'toole.

44th Canadian Parliament
Singh was re-elected with a comfortable majority of slightly more than 4,000 votes to serve in Burnaby-South. The 44th Canadian Parliament made very few changes to its predecessor, and the NDP emerged with its total number of seats unchanged at 25.

On 22 March 2022 the NDP struck a confidence-and-supply agreement with the governing Liberal Party of Canada over certain priorities: the government would “by the end of 2023” implement pharmacare and a "dental care program for low-income Canadians" would be a government priority to be enacted by 2025. The pact was influenced when the Freedom Convoy caused Trudeau to invoke and revoke the Emergencies Act over the vaccine mandate policy then in effect and also by the 2022 Russian invasion of Ukraine.

Political positions 
On the occasion of the launch of his leadership bid in 2017 Singh branded himself a progressive and a social democrat.

Drug policy 
Singh supports decriminalizing the purchase, possession and consumption of psychoactive drugs for personal use as Portugal had done in 2001.

Economic policy 
Singh's economic policy states that "millions of Canadians are living in poverty". Singh supports a progressive tax system and supports eliminating several tax deductions available to the highest-income earners and redirect the money to low-income seniors, workers and disabled Canadians. Singh's tax agenda during the 2017 New Democratic Party leadership election included creating new tax brackets for the highest-income earners and raising corporate tax.

Singh supports a $15/hour minimum wage, the imposition of Canadian sales taxes on paid on-demand internet video providers (also referred to as a "Netflix tax"), and a universal pharmacare system, stating "universal healthcare is essential when we talk about equality for all Canadians". The NDP have stated that closing tax loopholes on the ultra rich would fund a universal pharmacare program. After the 2018 federal budget was released, Singh criticized the Liberals' plan for research into pharmacare with no funding behind it, calling it "not a plan but a fantasy".

In January 2019 Singh promised to incentivize the building of 500,000 units of affordable housing by removing the federal tax burden on new affordable housing projects.

Energy policy 
Singh favours reducing Canada's carbon emissions to 30 percent of 2005 levels by 2025. This would be done by assisting provinces with the 2030 "coal phaseout", implementing a zero emissions vehicle agenda, "greening" the tax system by adding subsidies to companies supporting ecology and building renewable energy supergrid. Singh also supports creating more accountability in climate change policy by creating an independent officer of parliament mandated to report on interim progress on emission reductions (Climate Change Action Officer or CCAO), tasking the Commissioner of Environment and Sustainable Development (CESD) to the Auditor General with gathering data from each province and territory and appointing an advisory group composed of regional and topic-specific experts who will support the CCAO in interpreting data presented by the CESD and assessing implications for climate, energy, and economic policies and regulations. Singh's opposition to the Trans Mountain Pipeline expansion project was repeatedly condemned by Alberta NDP leader and former Premier of Alberta Rachel Notley.

Environmental policy 
On 31 May 2019 Singh promised that the NDP would build charging stations for electric vehicles at federal buildings and Canada Post locations and offer residents a $600 grant to help pay for home charging stations.

Singh initially supported Kitimat's LNG Canada facility supplied by the Coastal GasLink Pipeline in British Columbia that would impact native burial grounds and override unceded lands such as the Wetʼsuwetʼen. After the NDP lost Nanaimo in a May 2019 by-election to the Green Party, it took Singh only a week to change his position and then he started opposing the LNG natural gas facility. As of May 2019 Singh doesn't support fracking.

Quebec policy 
During the Lac-St. Jean by-election campaign which concluded in October 2017, he said he supports Quebec's right of self-determination and agrees with the NDP's 2005 Sherbrooke Declaration, which states, in opposition to the Clarity Act, that Canada should recognize any independence referendum won by Quebec sovereigntists.

During the 2019 federal election campaign it was noted that Singh opposed Bill 21 on religious symbols, but also said, "I don't know exactly" if Bill 21 was racist, and that there should be no political interference in the existing court challenges of the law.

Republicanism 
Singh has argued Canada should be a republic and that he doesn't see the relevance of the monarchy in the 21st century.

Social issues 

Recounting a personal experience where he was the subject of racial profiling, Singh has strongly supported legislation for a federal ban on carding, calling the practice a form of systemic racism.

When asked at NDP leadership debate in Saskatoon if he would bring back the long-gun registry Singh responded: "It's a difficult question, absolutely. I know that's why it is asked... I also think it's important that we acknowledge regional differences, the fact that there is a different culture between the way things are treated in different regions." Singh has urged Justin Trudeau and the Liberal Party to allow cities to ban handguns.

In March 2015, during the Ontario sex education curriculum controversy, Singh spoke out against changes to the curriculum which included proposed updating on teaching on sexual orientation and gender identity. Singh believes in training the RCMP in "LGBTQIA2S+ competency training" to ensure interactions with law enforcement are not stigmatizing or traumatizing. Singh also supports bringing a form of affirmative action for hiring of LGBTQ people and supports more inclusive shelter and transitional housing spaces in service of LGBTQ youth.

Singh advocates for Health Canada conducting research on the health care needs and experiences of LGBTQ patients and advocates for policy changes allowing people to self-declare their gender. Singh also supports immediately repealing the de facto ban on blood, tissue and organ donation by men who have sex with men and trans women who have sex with men.

Personal life 
Singh practices Brazilian jiu-jitsu.

Singh was recognized by the World Sikh Organization of Canada in their 2012 list of honourees for being the first turbaned Sikh MPP in Ontario.

In 2013, Singh was denied a visa to India for raising the issue of the 1984 Sikh massacre. He became the first Western legislator ever to be denied entry to India.

In a November 2017 episode of the TVOntario series Political Blind Date, Singh was paired with former Toronto City Councillor and future Premier of Ontario Doug Ford. The pair explored different forms of transportation, with Singh taking Ford on a downtown Toronto bicycle ride while Ford drove Singh along the dedicated streetcar right-of-way on St. Clair Avenue. Ford said of the experience that the two became friends, and Singh said Ford was "very warm and friendly". Jagmeet Singh is an avid cyclist and owns six designer bicycles.

In January 2018, Singh became engaged to Gurkiran Kaur Sidhu, a fashion designer and co-founder of jangiiro, a Punjabi clothing line. He proposed to her at the vegetarian restaurant where they had their first date, in front of friends, family, and members of the media that Singh had invited. The pair married on February 22, 2018. In August 2021 he announced that he was expecting a child with his spouse, their daughter was born in January 2022.

Singh is fluent in English, French, and Punjabi.

Electoral record

Federal elections

Burnaby South

Bramalea—Gore—Malton

Provincial elections

Leadership elections

Published works

References

Further reading 
 Ian Austen, "Jagmeet Singh, Canada’s Newest Political Star, Lifts His Party’s Hopes," New York Times, October 3, 2017.
 Ashifa Kassam, Jagmeet Singh: Canada's Pioneering Party Leader on Building Unity Amid Division," The Guardian, December 20, 2017.

External links 

 
 

Living people
1979 births
21st-century Canadian politicians
Canadian people of Indian descent
Canadian people of Punjabi descent
Canadian Sikhs
Canadian politicians of Indian descent
Canadian politicians of Punjabi descent
Canadian social democrats
Detroit Country Day School alumni
Drug policy reform activists
Lawyers in Ontario
Members of the House of Commons of Canada from British Columbia
NDP and CCF leaders
New Democratic Party MPs
Ontario New Democratic Party MPPs
Osgoode Hall Law School alumni
People from Scarborough, Toronto
Politicians from Brampton
University of Western Ontario alumni
Canadian republicans